Hitman 3 is a 2021 stealth game developed and published by IO Interactive. It is the sequel to the 2018 video game Hitman 2, the eighth main installment in the Hitman series and the third and final entry in the World of Assassination trilogy. Concluding the plot arc started in Hitman, the single-player storyline follows assassin Agent 47 and his allies as they hunt down the leaders of the secretive organization Providence, which controls the world's affairs and was partially responsible for 47's creation and upbringing.

The game is presented from a third-person perspective, with a focus on interactive elements in 47's environment. Like the previous entries in the series, the game features 6 levels, with 5 of them being large open-ended sandbox levels. Agent 47 can walk around each map freely to discover assassination opportunities. The player can complete challenges within each mission to unlock new items.

Hitman 3 was released worldwide for PlayStation 4, PlayStation 5, Windows, Xbox One, Xbox Series X/S, Stadia, and Nintendo Switch (via cloud gaming) on 20 January 2021. The game received positive reviews, with praise for its level design and atmosphere, stealth mechanics, and 47's abilities. Some critics called it the best entry in the series and it has been cited as one of the greatest stealth games of all time. Hitman 3 was the most commercially successful game in the franchise. It won various awards including "PC Game of the Year" at the 2021 Golden Joystick Awards. 

In 2023, IO rebranded Hitman 3 and began to call the game Hitman: World of Assassination, which has been previously used in the Stadia version. This rebranding included the first two Hitman games being available to Hitman 3 owners, free of charge, along with a brand new game mode called "Freelancer".

Gameplay
Like its predecessors, Hitman 3 is a stealth game played from a third-person perspective and players once again assume control of assassin Agent 47. In the game, 47 travels to various locations and carries out contracted assassinations, continuing the story of the last two games. The base game features six new locations: Dubai, Dartmoor, Berlin, Chongqing, Mendoza, and Carpathian Mountains, Romania. Owners of Hitman or Hitman 2 are able to import maps, levels, and their progress into Hitman 3.

The new locations in Hitman 3 include persistent shortcuts, a new gameplay feature to the series. Each stage includes several initially locked doors which can only be unlocked from one side; once unlocked, these doors stay open in all future playthroughs, allowing initially closed-off locations to be reached more quickly. Hitman 3 added a new camera item available by default which can be used to take photos and is used for gameplay purposes such as opening doors on certain maps. Another new feature in the game is numerical keypads, where players have to find four-digit codes and enter them manually to open doors and safes.

The game features PlayStation VR compatibility on the PlayStation 4 version, with support for PlayStation 5 via backwards compatibility, Support for VR on PC was added on 20 January 2022. The VR functionality retroactively applies to levels imported from the previous two entries. Unlike Hitman 2, there are no multiplayer modes, with Sniper Assassin being solely single-player, and Ghost Mode being removed entirely.

Hitman 3 features Contracts Mode, where a player can select up to five targets across all the maps in the series, add rules and complications like specific kill methods and share their contracts with other players. 'Featured Contracts' are regularly added, which may be a selection of community contracts on a certain theme (such as during the Seasons of Sin) or contracts made by specific gaming publications or YouTube channels like Kinda Funny or Eurogamer. The game features side missions created by the developers known as "Escalations" which are multi-stage contracts that get progressively harder as the player completes each stage.

Hitman 3 features 'Elusive Targets' which are time-limited missions that can only be attempted once. On 20 January 2022, IO Interactive added a new game mode called 'Elusive Target Arcade'. This allows users to play 'Arcade Contracts', with each contract consisting of a series of previous Elusive Targets that must be eliminated in order. Each contract has a complication, which may require the player to change their strategies. Players can earn rewards for completing contracts but if the player fails a contract, they must wait 12 hours before attempting it again.

Plot
During the events of Hitman 2, professional assassin Agent 47 and his handler, Diana Burnwood, defected from the International Contract Agency (ICA) and joined forces with rogue mercenary Lucas Grey to destroy Providence, a secretive alliance of corporate executives, politicians and industrialists collectively wielding political, military, and economic influence. While 47 and Grey seek revenge on Providence for turning them both into assassins, Diana is motivated by the death of her parents, unaware that 47 carried out the killings. The trio kidnapped Arthur Edwards, Providence's intermediary known as the Constant, who identified the three Partners controlling Providence: Carl Ingram, Marcus Stuyvesant, and Alexa Carlisle. Edwards, however, later escaped captivity and seized the Partners' corporate assets for himself.

Working together, 47 and Grey eliminate Ingram and Stuyvesant in Dubai during the inauguration of the Scepter, the world's tallest skyscraper, and Carlisle at her ancestral manor in Dartmoor, England. Following the Partners' deaths, Edwards assumes control of Providence and deploys mercenaries who capture Grey and Diana. Grey commits suicide to ensure 47 is not captured.

47 arranges to meet hacker Olivia Hall, Grey's only other trusted ally, in Berlin. Discovering that the ICA is tailing them, 47 kills several ICA agents sent to eliminate him, before he and Hall decide to conclusively stop the ICA by exposing its crimes to the public. 47 eliminates Hush and Imogen Royce, the overseers of the ICA data storage facility in Chongqing, China, allowing Hall to steal and publish all of the ICA's operational data while deleting all records of himself and Diana. The ICA is irrevocably compromised and dismantled, ending 47's career as a professional assassin.

Meanwhile, Edwards attempts to convert Diana to succeed him as Constant and seeks her betrayal of 47 by revealing his killing of her parents. Diana seemingly double-deals both sides, accepting Edwards's offer while inviting 47 to a gathering of Providence members in Mendoza, Argentina, where he is instructed to eliminate the only people opposed to Diana's succession—Tamara Vidal and Don Archibald Yates—so that she can dismantle the organization upon assuming control. While he follows her instructions, 47's longtime trust in Diana is shaken when she incapacitates him with poison in revenge for the murder of her parents.

In a dream, a vision of Grey persuades 47 that Diana has not betrayed him, but rather helped to put Edwards within his reach. 47 wakes up imprisoned on a train travelling through the Carpathian Mountains, with Edwards also on board. Though Edwards intends to make 47 into an assassin for Providence once more by wiping his memory with a serum injection, 47 breaks free, either kills Edwards or injects him with the serum, and flees into the wild. Meanwhile, Diana assumes power as Constant and enacts a purge of Providence's members from leadership positions at major global corporations, dismantling Providence's power structure.

One year later, 47 reconnects with Diana, tracing her call to a secluded cabin in the snow, but finds Diana is no longer staying there anymore. 47 eventually makes contact with Diana with a phone that was left for him at the cabin. The pair collectively agree to return to their former roles as assassin and handler as a means of keeping the global elites in check, but will no longer have ties to the ICA, effectively making them Freelance.

In an alternate ending, if 47 injects himself with the serum while confronting Edwards, he passes out, and later awakens in a padded room, greeted by Edwards's voice telling him, "Wake up. Wake up, my friend. It's the dawn of a new day, and you have things to do"—akin to the opening of Hitman: Codename 47.

Development

Announcement 
The game was announced on 11 June 2020 at the PlayStation 5 reveal event with the tagline 'Death Awaits'. The first location of the game, Dubai, was revealed on the same day. Developers stated that the game would be "a lot more mature, serious and darker" than previous installments in the trilogy. It was confirmed that fully animated cutscenes like in the first Hitman would be returning after Hitman 2 used still images for its cutscenes. The Stadia version titled Hitman: World of Assassination was announced on 14 July 2020, which acts as a hub to play Hitman and Hitman 2 on the platform. This version was the debut of Stadia's 'State Share' feature which lets players share 'game states' allowing others to play the same contract with the same items and starting location as them even if they have not unlocked them yet. On 28 October 2020 during a Nintendo Direct the game was announced to be coming to Nintendo Switch via cloud streaming technology. A VR mode releasing for PlayStation VR was announced during a PlayStation State of Play live stream on 6 August 2020.

The second location, Dartmoor, was revealed on 26 August 2020 with IO Interactive also confirming they had signed a 12-month exclusivity period for the PC version with the Epic Games Store, explaining "as an independent studio, our partnership with Epic has given us the freedom to create Hitman 3 exactly as we imagined and self-publish the game to our players directly". The Chongqing location was revealed on 24 November 2020 and the final 3 locations were revealed on 11 January 2021. IO Interactive confirmed the game would support 4K resolutions at 60 frames per second on consoles like the PlayStation 5 and Xbox Series X. The opening cinematic was revealed on 15 December 2020.

Locations 
Each location in the game started with the team deciding on some keywords and phrases that would define the themes of the level with game director Mattias Engström saying in an interview that the decision of where to set each level comes from where they wanted the emotions and story to be at that location.

Dubai 
Engström gave the level designers and artists for the opening mission in Dubai phrases such as "an inviting beginning", "open and airy" and "on top of the world" (which is the name for the mission in the game). Engström describes how the keywords and mission name refer not only to the setting, but also to how "they have momentum in a story where everything is going fine. You can see that in the colors and the general feel of the mission". During development the team felt that the level was not living up to the "vertigo" and "verticality" keywords and giving the player the feeling they were high up on massive skyscraper. As a result, the beginning of the mission was changed with the player no longer starting at the elevator leading up to the atrium and instead starting outside the skyscraper and having to work their way inside. IO Interactive's art director and lead environment artist visited Dubai early in development to gather reference material.

Dartmoor 
Dartmoor was based around phrases like "a house filled with secrets", "ominous" and "vulnerable". The mansion setting was decided quite early on in development and features a gothic design inspired by detective fiction such as Agatha Christie novels. Developers at IO had wanted to create a murder-mystery level for a long time but the idea was always very daunting with developers questioning things such as if the killer should change every time and how to tie the mystery into the gameplay. In an interview with Screen Rant Engström describes how the idea stuck "because it's not really core Hitman in a way, but role playing and taking a disguise and living out the fantasy, that's a core Hitman idea. It sort of fits the general tone for this trilogy". As this was the final entry in the trilogy, the team decided take the opportunity to fulfil many of these ideas like the murder-mystery which previously they had been unable or afraid to do. Engström says that this confidence came from how they had "been able to master the tools, but also how to design a mission" over the course of developing the trilogy. IO were aware that Agent 47 would realistically probably not waste his time actually solving a murder but they thought the idea was too fun.

A murder-mystery allowed the team to fulfil another one of their goals which was providing insight into Providence. This was done through the player learning the backstory of the Carlisle family as they discover clues and interrogate suspects. In order for the idea to work the detective disguise needed to have free access to most of the level which contrasts with most Hitman levels where the player has to avoid being detected, with Engström saying to Game Informer "I don't think a Hitman game needs to be hard or a level needs to be hard in order to be fun. That's not needed, and I think we prove that quite well in England".

The linear structure of a murder-mystery caused IO rework some of their mechanics and narrative paths as they clashed with the design principles of replayibility and player freedom. The team experimented with using randomized culprits but struggled to build as deep a narrative and found it "mess[ed] with the canon of the plot". Despite the singular fixed story, Engström states "there's replayability, because you need to play it many times to really understand how everything connects". The player is able to gather evidence to accuse different characters resulting in different outcomes. The intel system had to be redesigned into organised categories to allow players to more easily keep track of information. The clues themselves had to be designed to be found in a non-linear fashion.

The first version of the mission allowed the player full freedom to explore rooms and talk to people but the player would not know who exactly they could talk to or which rooms were relevant. Senior level designer Toke Kreinart describes to The Washington Post how in response he "took the blunt force approach and put a little icon on everyone and everywhere that was relevant" but this was "actually not that much fun" as playtesters would just go around each icon interacting with all the prompts. The final mission uses more subtle ways to guide players, for example conversations between staff members and guards are deliberately placed to ease players into the story. Sound cues such as a draft of wind through a room or the sound of ruffling paper are also used to hint the player in the right direction towards clues. The addition of a secondary target where the player would be asked to kill the true culprit if they accused them of the murder was considered but was cut. This was due to the sheer amount of content that was already in the level and also for story reasons because the mood of the level changes once all objectives are completed.

The team had already been working on Dartmoor for some time before going to see the film Knives Out (which Dartmoor has been compared to by reviewers) and decided to include a baseball in the level as a reference to the film.

Berlin 
The Berlin mission was based on the key words "loneliness" and "isolation" and features a cold opening and none of the guided missions stories found in other Hitman levels. Engström describes how in this level "47 is defining his own mission for the first time". The forest featured in the opening was deliberately designed to be cold and isolating to contrast with the rave found in the main part of the level. Berlin started out as a typical Hitman level with a primary target, Agent Montgomery (the only agent with a bodyguard in the level), and the other agents as optional targets. However, it was later decided to make the choice of targets fully up to the player in order to give them more freedom to explore the level. Initially, all 10 agents would show up in the game's instinct mode just like targets in other levels, but this was found to be overwhelming for a first playthrough. This resulted in the gameplay mechanic of the player having to find and identify the agents around the level. The introductory sequence where the player kills one "snack target" was designed to introduce this concept to the player. Agent 47 stealing this first agent's earpiece to listen to their handler provided a way to update the player with information in a level without a typical handler like Diana or Olivia. Berlin was the most expensive level to make in the game due to the development that went into features such as the target identification and how to present information to the player.

Berlin is the first level in the trilogy to feature armed targets who will fight back at the player instead of running into lockdown. A lot of development was required to make sure this mechanic was not too punishing for the player. In earlier versions, the targets would immediately pull out their weapon to shoot Agent 47 if they spotted him which would result in players almost always dying. Adding to the difficulty was that targets initially walked around in pairs. A feature was prototyped where if one target spotted the player, they would call all the other targets to come to that location. However, despite being more realistic this idea was found to be breaking the level, with level designer Bjarne Christiansen explaining "one target sees you and then suddenly you have all the targets in the same location and you're done with the mission".

IO spent a lot of effort into making the rave and music in the Berlin nightclub authentic. The main level designer for the mission lives in Berlin and did location scouting for the level such as taking reference photos and recording sounds. Instead of using tracks from other sources, Hitman 3 composer Niels Bye Nielsen wrote all of the additional music featured in the game such as the rave music which is a first for the series. The crowd NPCs are programmed to adjust their dance moves in response to the music as it builds. Lead game designer Sidsel Hermansen described to Game Informer how she used to go raves a lot but had not been able to due to the COVID-19 pandemic. She says experiencing the club in VR has "actually been kind of a reminder. It's been a beautiful thing to be able to go there".

Chongqing 
Chongqing features the introduction of new water effects, as raindrops will hit Agent 47 and get his clothes wet which adds to the player immersion. The location showcases the improved lighting and reflections of Hitman 3 due to the neon lighting found in the level. The heavy rain was designed to match the tone of the story during the mission with Engström saying that "you're basically killing who you have been for the past 20 years as a hitman" in Chongqing.

Mendoza 
The Mendoza location was IO Interactive's first attempt to depict Argentina in the Hitman franchise. The original two ideas for the level were a "tango location set in Buenos Aires" or a vineyard in South Africa. Both these ideas were combined and Mendoza was chosen as the final destination due to its nature as "one of the most internationally recognizable wine regions in Argentina". The company went to great lengths to create a fictional location with authentic-looking terrain and vegetation, to show the winemaking process, and to accurately portray aspects of Argentine culture like the tango and the drinking of mate. As IO Interactive's associate producer Pablo Prada is from Argentina, he provided insight for many aspects of the level. The real-life Villavicencio Natural Reserve was an inspiration for the architecture of the level while professional dancers were hired for the tango animations and consulted about the music. The level features an asado barbecue pit.

The one major compromise to the authenticity of Mendoza was the decision to reuse existing non-player character (NPC) dialogue which had been recorded with Colombian and Mexican accents, rather than recording new NPC dialogue with authentic Argentine accents. According to IO Interactive, this was because of time and budgetary constraints and the additional complication of the COVID-19 pandemic. The company chose to focus on securing appropriate voice talent for the Chongqing location.

Agent 47's handler Diana Burnwood appears in-person for the first time in the series in the Mendoza mission. At the end of the mission, 47 meets Diana on the dancefloor for a tango. IO chose to limit the player's outfit choices for this particular moment in order to maintain the atmosphere and not undermine the storytelling. When speaking to Polygon about this decision Engström says "we have Diana in-game; they're going to do a tango on the dance floor. We're going to treat it with respect all the way through". Both David Bateson and Jane Perry, the voice actors for Agent 47 and Diana respectively, named the tango scene as their favourite Agent 47 and Diana interaction from the series.

Carpathian Mountains 
With the final level set on a train in the Carpathian Mountains, the purpose was to have "a narratively driven set-piece that is setting up closure for the trilogy” as described by Engström to Polygon. The train was designed as a metaphor for 47 spending his life "following a path determined by others", with his stepping off the train at the end being symbolic of 47 leaving his past as a contract killer behind at the end of the story. Developers were aware the train level may be controversial but ultimately Engström stated "I read and hear and, like, I can understand the criticism and the feedback. But, you know, it did what I think we wanted and needed it to do". In an interview executive producer Forest Swartout Large describes how even though this level is more "on-rails" they still provide the player with options as they can go "action-style, guns blazing" taking out all the enemies or instead use stealth to sneak past.

Ambrose Island 
Ambrose Island was added as a free downloadable content (DLC) as part of the Year 2 Update and is set during the events of Hitman 2. Live game director Kevin Goyon describes how they wanted a "pirate fantasy" and "to make a location that felt dangerous – but where 47 would belong". IO wanted to feature Lucas Grey and explore what happened to the militia after he left them during Hitman 2. Goyon describes how they "found it interesting to explore who could have taken over the leadership of the militia, but also hint at the past relationship with the Maelstrom's pirate syndicate at large", with the Maelstrom being a central character in the Mumbai location from Hitman 2. Another idea they explored in the map was that of rival factions, with the militia and pirates on the island "on the brink of a conflict" which Goyon describes allowed them "to create a rich lore and interesting situations".

The location being set on an island came easily to the team and provided a natural way to define the boundaries of the map. In contrast to other outdoor Hitman maps such as Santa Fortuna and Mumbai from Hitman 2 which heavily revolve around built-up areas, Ambrose Island was designed around the natural rocky topology and jungles of the island with much of the map consisting of natural environments. These divide the map into different zones and allowed the team to experiment with more verticality than usual on the map.

Design and story 
For Hitman 3 IO Interactive wanted a more mature darker tone than Hitman 2 which had embraced more of the comedy and playful elements of the franchise. This led to the introduction of many hand-crafted moments designed around the first time playthrough, with the aim being to integrate many core story moments into the gameplay. Game director Mattias Engström says that in Hitman 2 the Mumbai and Miami missions were examples of IO reaching their limit in terms of mission size, and that "it's better to be a little sharper and more focused, to create a more polished and coherent experience" as large levels can be overwhelming for players to replay.

The ending of the game was conceived early in development and was used as the starting point from which to create the story and all the locations. Engström says "from [the ending], we created an emotional journey so that each and every location had a purpose in terms of tone and feel to make the ending hit as good as it could". He describes how each of the first four missions gets "greyer" and darker than the last. The ending was designed to be a satisfying conclusion to the trilogy for players but was intentionally left open in line with Hitmans theme of "player empowerment".

Developers were inspired by immersive sim games when adding many of the new features for Hitman 3 like the keypads. These provided a new way to create puzzles for the player. The introduction of persistent shortcuts that can only be opened from one direction but will stay open permanently in all future playthroughs was designed to "encourage exploration, reward curiosity, and incentivize replayability". Predictability and consistency were key factors for the AI with developers wanting the game to be fun and interesting to experiment with even if it meant the AI seemed to be "stupid" sometimes. The number of guided mission stories and opportunities was reduced to three on most maps, with Berlin and Carpathian Mountains featuring no mission stories at all. This was done to focus on making the guided ones longer and more complex, however the game still features many 'unguided' mission stories with Forest Swartout Large saying "there are around a dozen story-supported ways of taking out your targets".

IO Interactive considered using an episodic model for Hitman 3 like that seen in 2016's Hitman, where the first location would have released in August 2020.

Technology 
IO Interactive decided to make heavy use of lossless LZ4 compression to reduce the file size of Hitman 3. Due to engine improvements it was now possible to run nearly everything in the game through this compression algorithm. With Hitman 3, the way the content from the older titles is imported was changed, which results in less duplicate data compared to Hitman where each episode needed all the code and assets to work standalone. The result is a file size for Hitman 3 of only around 60-70 GB including all of the maps and content from both Hitman 2 and Hitman. By comparison, the full size of Hitman 2 with all the maps from Hitman is nearly 150 GB.

In November 2020 IO Interactive announced that they had teamed up with Intel to optimise Hitman 3 performance on high-end CPUs with 8+ cores, which results in more crowds and environment destructibility. They announced they were introducing Variable Rate Shading into the game, a technique for improving rendering performance by dynamically changing the rate of shading in different parts of the frame. The PC version supports directional reverb, where sound reflected off surfaces will emanate from the general direction where the sound is located instead of seeming to come from all around the player. This improves the clarity of the audio mix and player's ability to localize sound in a given space. More high-end CPU features were added to the game on 24 May 2022 with the introduction of real-time raytracing and adaptive supersampling (using Nvidia DLSS or AMD FidelityFX Super Resolution). Intel XeSS technology was implemented into the game in October 2022, which uses machine learning to improve performance and image quality.

VR 
The idea to add a VR mode to the game originated in 2018 when a senior game designer brought his PlayStation VR headset into the office to show it off. People at the office found that they "couldn't stop playing" the game Firewall: Zero Hour which inspired the developers to make their own VR mode for Hitman 3. The size of the VR team was only around 10 or 12 people. The team found during development that the nature of the game's levels naturally suited the new perspective offered by VR even though they were not designed with it in mind. The cover system was reworked with players physically crouching to hide out of sight instead of locking into a cover system. Similarly players now have free-form movement with the game's melee weapons instead of being locked into scripted animations. Many items which previously would have been quite small on the screen or obscured by UI can now be seen up close in detail. The guns in the game were found to already have the necessary holographic sights required for aiming in first-person despite being part of a third-person game. Due to the nature of VR being designed to be an immersive personal experience and the team's decision not to tone down any of the violent content of the game, developers found themselves playing the game slower and less violently.

With the PC VR release in 2022, IO Interactive wanted to include more physicality into the game and to take advantage of having two controllers instead of a single DualShock controller, for example with how the player throws items or holds a weapon with two hands.

PC level transfer controversy 
On 15 January 2021, IO Interactive announced that unlike console players, PC players would have to pay for an access pass to unlock Hitman 2 locations in Hitman 3, even after announcing in August 2020 that players would unlock them in Hitman 3 at no additional cost. This led to criticism over IO's exclusivity deal for the game with the Epic Games Store, especially since most players already owned Hitman 2 on Steam. Tim Sweeney, Epic Games' CEO, later responded to the announcement with: "Sorry, the team is looking into this with IO. It's never Epic's intent to create a situation where someone who owns a game on Steam would have to buy it again on Epic Games Store to get the full benefits of it." Two days later, IO Interactive said they were working on a solution to allow Steam players to import locations to the Epic Games Store. They guaranteed that players will not need to repurchase the games; however, they admitted there would be a delay and players could not import Hitman 2 locations into Hitman 3 for a few weeks. The location transfer system was implemented a month later on 18 February 2021.

Release
On 27 August 2020, digital-only pre-orders for the game launched for PlayStation, PC and Xbox players. A 'Trinity Pack' featuring 9 items (3 suits, 3 pistols and 3 briefcases all with Red, White and Black variants) was available as a pre-order bonus. It was announced that a Deluxe Edition of the game would be released, which includes Deluxe Escalations, in-game items and suits as well as digital soundtracks for the trilogy and a digital book featuring information about targets and locations from the trilogy. On 8 September 2020, pre-orders for Stadia went live. On 15 October 2020, it was announced that physical copies of an exclusive variant of the Deluxe Edition containing all the digital content and an exclusive physical passport would be released by Limited Run Games. On 30 October 2020, standard retail physical copies for both editions of the game were announced through traditional brick and mortar retail stores.

The game released on 20 January 2021, with IO Interactive self-publishing the game. It was released for Windows via Epic Games Store, PlayStation 4, PlayStation 5, Xbox One, Xbox Series X/S, Nintendo Switch (via cloud gaming) and streaming service Stadia (under the title Hitman: World of Assassination). The physical version was distributed by Square Enix in Europe, Middle East, Africa and Australasia. Despite IO Interactive having to shift to remote working during the development of Hitman 3, they were still able to release the game on time.

After launch the game was plagued with server-based issues, with users unable to transfer over their progress from Hitman 2, users unable to use their Access Pass levels, and users unable to access the servers at all, leaving them unable to make progress in the game.

A week after Hitman 3 release, IO's studio head Hakan Abrak stated they had made back their development costs for the game, and "that puts us in a really good place and allows us to confidently move forward with our ambitious plans for future projects.", the first being a James Bond game.

Downloadable content and post-launch updates 
Downloadable content (DLC) for the game was confirmed in an interview with IO Interactive on 29 January 2021, although no specific release date was given. On 24 March 2021, IO Interactive announced "Seven Deadly Sins", an expansion made up of seven content packs themed around the seven deadly sins. Despite being announced two months after the game released, the DLC was not included in the Deluxe pack. The sins are Greed, Pride, Sloth, Lust, Gluttony, Envy and Wrath, with the packs being released in that order. The first pack (Greed) was released on 30 March. The packs can be bought individually or collectively as part of a season pass. Each pack contains a unique escalation, a new suit and a new sin-themed item. The release of each pack started a new 'Season of Sin' lasting between four and six weeks, during which the regular free content such as featured contracts and elusive targets would be themed around the sin for that season. The final pack (Wrath) was released on 26 October 2021, with the "Season of Wrath" concluding on 29 November.

The Hitman 3 Free Starter Pack was made available on 30 March 2021, which grants players permanent access to the ICA Facility training missions as well as periodic free access to other locations from the trilogy. It allows players who own Hitman and Hitman 2 but not the full Hitman 3 game to import their maps in order to play with the features added in Hitman 3 such as improved lighting and the new camera item.

On 30 March 2021 a seasonal Egg Hunt escalation set in the Berlin map was added temporarily to the game. It was later permanently added to the game in April 2022. A permanent new event called the Dartmoor Garden Show was added for free in August 2021, with contracts mode also being added on the new map variant.

In September 2022, Google announced they would be discontinuing their Stadia service in January 2023. In response IO Interactive announced: "To all our Hitman fans on Google Stadia. We hear you - we are looking into ways for you to continue your Hitman experience on other platforms." In December 2022, IO Interactive announced that Stadia players would be able to transfer their progress to other platforms in the period 11 January until 17 February 2023.

Year 2 update 
On 22 November 2021, IO Interactive announced the Year 2 update for Hitman 3, which features ray tracing for PC, PCVR support and a permanent new game mode known as 'Elusive Target Arcade'. On 13 January 2022, IO Interactive fully revealed the Year 2 update and announced the Hitman Trilogy, a collection of the three games in the World of Assassination trilogy. Both Hitman 3 and Hitman Trilogy were announced to be releasing on Steam and Xbox Game Pass/PC Game Pass on 20 January 2022. The full Year 2 update reveal included further details about the Elusive Target Arcade and the announcement of a new 'Freelancer' game mode. Freelancer, which is set sometime after the Hitman 3 epilogue, would introduce a customisable safehouse for 47, mission hub, and various items and NPCs. Freelancer was due to release in Q2 2022, however, in May the game mode was delayed until the second half of 2022. A new map codenamed 'Rocky' was advertised, with the name later being revealed as 'Ambrose Island'. The map was released on July 26 as a free expansion for all players. In October the Freelancer mode was delayed again with a new planned release date of 26 January 2023. IO Interactive announced it would be a free update for all Hitman 3 players and they would be allowing select PC players to participate in closed technical tests over the coming months.

On 20 January 2022, Hitman Trilogy was released, which contains Hitman 3 and access passes for importing the levels from the first two games into Hitman 3. The game was released to the Microsoft Store for Windows 10 and Windows 11, this version has full cross-progression support with the Xbox version. The Elusive Target Arcade was released on the same day.

Hitman 3 was released to Steam on 20 January with PCVR support on the same day. The Trinity pack pre-order bonus was available for free for anyone who purchased the game on Steam in the first 30 days. Upon launch the Steam version was met with a wave of negative reviews with players complaining about the price being the same as when the game had launched on the Epic Games Store a year earlier. There were complaints that the pricing system was confusing due to the large amount of different versions of the game available. In response, IO Interactive said in a statement that the "Hitman 3 launch on Steam didn't go as planned" and offered all players who had already bought the game or who purchased it through to 19 February a free upgrade to the Deluxe Edition of the game. Players who already owned or purchased either the Deluxe Edition or Hitman Trilogy would gain the Seven Deadly Sins DLC for free instead.

Reception

Hitman 3 received "generally favorable" reviews, according to review aggregator Metacritic. It has been considered by some critics to be the best entry in the series and one of the greatest stealth games of all time.

IGN gave the game a 9/10, writing "Rich, rewarding, and highly replayable, Hitman 3 is a superb instalment of IO's idiosyncratic but much-loved stealth series." GamesRadar+ gave the game 4.5/5 stars, praising the "fun and imaginative murders, beautiful levels to explore, [and] incredible world-building" and calling it a "slick and entertaining conclusion to the trilogy". GameSpot wrote: "What's good about Hitman—its level design and the creativity, experimentation, and exploration that affords—is great in Hitman 3." PC Gamer wrote: "Hitman 3 is a magnificent videogame and a perfect swansong for Agent 47".

The game's level design received critical praise. PC Gamer writes in their "Best Stealth" award article that "[the] impeccable design is what makes Hitman 3 not just a great stealth game, but a near endlessly replayable one". The Dartmoor map was particularly praised for the optional murder mystery elements, drawing comparisons to the movie Knives Out. GameSpot named Berlin as "one of the best sandboxes to explore in 2021" and a "standout level that encapsulates everything that's fantastic about the recent trilogy into a layered and lethal sandbox of creative carnage". The Mendoza level was celebrated for its realistic depiction of Argentina. The final level set on a train in the Carpathian Mountains however received criticism for its linearity and for feeling out of place for a Hitman level. Polygon writes how some fans were disappointed with the final level after IO Interactive promised the game would contain 6 new maps, assuming this would mean 6 new sandbox levels.

The ability to import content from Hitman and Hitman 2 in order to have the maps of all three games in one was praised with PC Gamer stating that "do that [import the levels from the previous games], and this is easily one of the best games on PC". However it was noted by some reviewers that the process for doing so was "convoluted".

The removal of Ghost Mode and the co-operative Sniper Assassin mode from Hitman 2 was criticised by some reviewers, with GameSpot describing how it meant "the game itself is scaled down somewhat as an overall package".

The PlayStation VR mode received mostly positive reviews and was praised for its immersion, impressive visuals for a PSVR title and for supporting all the maps in the trilogy. It was however criticised for the visual downgrades required to make it run on PSVR compared to the regular game such as a lack of reflections and low draw distance. The control scheme utilising a combination of DualShock 4 controller and motion controls received mixed reviews. The PC VR version released in 2022 was heavily criticised for not offering full motion controls or improving upon the flaws of the PlayStation version.

Sales
It was reported on 24 January 2021, Hitman 3 had taken the number 1 position in the UK game boxed charts, with launch sales up 17% over Hitman 2.

By April 2021, IO Interactive CEO Hakan Abrak stated that Hitman 3 had performed "300% better commercially" than its predecessor Hitman 2.

It was reported on 22 November 2021 that Hitman 3 was the most successful game from the franchise and that the entire World of Assassination trilogy had reached 50 million players.

Awards and accolades
Hitman 3 received the "PC Game of the Year" award at the Golden Joystick Awards 2021 and the "Best Stealth" award from PC Gamer. Several publications considered it one of the best video games of the year, including Push Square, Electronic Gaming Monthly, Time, Ars Technica, The Guardian, IGN, TechRadar, GamesRadar, The Washington Post, Edge, Kotaku, GameSpot, Rock Paper Shotgun, Giant Bomb, VG247, NME, Eurogamer, Gamereactor, Mashable, The A.V. Club and Polygon. PC Gamer placed the game 2nd in their 2021 "Top 100 PC Games" list and 5th in their 2022 list.

The game was nominated for "Best VR/AR Game" at The Game Awards 2021 for its PlayStation VR mode. Eurogamers Ian Higton named it as the best PS VR game of 2021 and it was also voted the best PS VR game of 2021 by readers of PlayStation Blog.. After its Steam release in 2022, Hitman 3 won "VR Game of the Year" at the 2022 Steam Awards.

IO Interactive was nominated for "Best Game Development Studio" at the NME Awards 2022.

An episode of the A Sound Effect Podcast featuring Hitman 3 developers titled "How Hitman 3s powerful sound was made with the audio team at IO Interactive" was nominated for "Best Game Audio Presentation Podcast or Broadcast" at the 2022 Game Audio Network Guild Awards.

Future
In various interviews conducted with IO Interactive, they have confirmed that despite Hitman 3 being the final game in the World of Assassination trilogy, it will not be the last game in the franchise. Christian Elverdam, IO Interactive's chief creative officer, has said that walking away from the Hitman franchise for the time being and closing the door on this chapter of Agent 47's story feels fitting. IO Interactive have confirmed they are likely going to do a new take on the gaming formula when they return to the Hitman series in the future.

References

External links 
 

2021 video games
Cloud-based Nintendo Switch games
Fiction about secret societies
Golden Joystick Award winners
Hitman (franchise)
Interquel video games
Nintendo Switch games
PlayStation 4 games
PlayStation 5 games
Seven deadly sins in popular culture
Single-player video games
Stadia games
Stealth video games
Video game sequels
Video games developed in Denmark
Video games set in 2021
Video games set in Argentina
Video games set in Berlin
Video games set in China
Video games set in Devon
Video games set in Dubai
Video games set in Greenland
Video games set in India
Video games set in Romania
Video games set on fictional islands
Video games with alternate endings
Windows games
Xbox One games
Xbox Series X and Series S games